Michael Wilhelmer Zuurman (born September 8, 1974, in Veendam) is a Dutch biologist by education and programmer for the non-profit organization Xentax Foundation in Emmen. His professional career is in programming, science and pharmaceuticals. His 'handle' is Mr. Mouse.

Education
Biology at the University of Groningen from 1993 to 1999
PhD student at the Department of Medical Physiology of the same university from 1999 to 2003
PhD title in 2003 after finishing the thesis entitled "Orphan chemokine receptors in neuroimmunology: functional and pharmacological analysis of L-CCR and HCR"

Profession
 Medical Adviser for Novartis from 2007 onwards
 Post-doctoral fellow at the University Medical Center Groningen from 2003 to 2007
 Founder of Xentax Foundation in 2006, originally starting as a Commodore 64 demo and music group in 1989, and currently chairman since then. 
 Freelance game journalist and moderator for PCZone Benelux from 2001 to 2002, a hard-copy game magazine that was disbanded in 2005

Publications
 Scientific publications in peer reviewed journals
 MultiEx Commander, a game file handler
 MexScript, a multi-paradigm computer scripting language
 Metacritic: Quantify Me. A 30-page quantitative analysis of the games data at Metacritic.
 MobyGames: Quantify Me. A brief quantitative analysis of the gaming era according to MobyGames.  
 Commodore 64 Scene statistical history 'CSDb - Quantify Me'
 'The definitive guide to exploring file formats'
 Commodore 64 music
 Commodore 64 programs

References

External links
Personal Website
Xentax Foundation

1974 births
Living people
Dutch computer programmers
University of Groningen alumni
People from Veendam